Theodor Rumpel may refer to:

 Theodor Rumpel (surgeon) (1862–1923), German surgeon
 Theodor Rumpel (aviator) (1897–?), German World War I flying ace